The Leica Q2 is a full-frame fixed-lens camera introduced in 2019. 

The Q2 is a successor to the Leica Q and Leica Q-P. The Q2 has a stabilized 28 mm f/1.7 Summilux fixed lens with a digital zoom equivalent corresponding to focal lengths of 28, 35, 50, and 75 mm. The Q2 features a 47.3MP CMOS full frame sensor, measuring 36 x 24 mm. It is capable of DCI and UHD 4K video recording at ISO sensitivities up to 50,000 and a maximum of 10 frames per second and an updated autofocus. Also it has IP52-rated dust and water resistance.

The Q2 uses Bluetooth Low Energy for connectivity via the Leica FOTOS app, and its battery yields a CIPA rating of 370 shots per charge. The Q2's high resolution OLED electronic view finder has a resolution of 3.68 megapixels. The Q2's body includes weather sealing against dust and water spray.

It replaces the popular original Leica Q (Typ 116), introduced in 2015, and is designed in the manner of a typical Leica M rangefinder.

References

External links
  Leica Q2 user report, review and sample photos by Thorsten Overgaard

Full-frame mirrorless fixed-lens cameras
Q2
Cameras introduced in 2019